Edward Chamberlain may refer to:

Politicians
Edward Chamberlain (died 1557), MP for Heytesbury, Buckingham and Mitchell
Edward Chamberlain (1480–1543), MP for Wallingford
Edward Chamberlain (1503–1557), MP for Nottingham

Others
Edward Blanchard Chamberlain, botanist and bryologist
Edward Chamberlin (1899–1967), American economist
Edward Chamberlayne (1616–1703), English writer
Ted Chamberlain (Edward Edinborough Chamberlain, 1906–1993), New Zealand plant pathologist
Ed Chamberlain, Irish rugby league player